Hec Day was an Australian professional rugby league footballer who played in the 1930s and 1940s.  He played for Balmain as a fullback.

Playing career

Day made his debut in Round 1 of the 1939 season for Balmain against Newtown which Balmain won 13–9.  

The same year, Day was a member of the Balmain side which won the 1939 premiership defeating South Sydney 33–4 in the grand final at the Sydney Cricket Ground with Day kicking five goals in the match.  

Day played in four more seasons for Balmain and retired at the end of 1943.

References

Balmain Tigers players
Australian rugby league players
Rugby league players from Sydney
Rugby league fullbacks
Place of birth missing
Year of birth missing
Year of death missing
Place of death missing